Richard Anthony Hudson FBA (born 18 September 1939) is a British linguist. He is best known for Word Grammar, a wide-ranging theory of syntax.

Life
Hudson is the son of the horticulturalist and bomb-disposal officer John Pilkington Hudson. He has lived in England for most of his life (with three years in New Zealand, 1945–1948). He studied linguistics at Loughborough Grammar School in Leicestershire (1948–1958), Corpus Christi College, Cambridge (1958–1961) and the School of Oriental and African Studies (Ph.D., 1961–1964). He worked with Michael Halliday as research assistant on two projects at University College London: on the grammar of scientific English with Rodney Huddleston (1964–1967), and on Linguistics and English Teaching (1967–1970). In 1970, he was appointed lecturer at UCL, where he spent the rest of his working life, mostly in the Department of Phonetics and Linguistics, retiring in 2004. He has also worked to build bridges between academic linguistics and teaching of (and about) language in UK schools.

Notable works

References

External links

1939 births
20th-century linguists
21st-century linguists
Academics of University College London
Alumni of Corpus Christi College, Cambridge
Alumni of SOAS University of London
Linguists from the United Kingdom
Living people
People educated at Loughborough Grammar School
Sociolinguists
Syntacticians